The Register of Historic Parks and Gardens of Special Historic Interest in England, created in 1983, is administered by Historic England.  It includes more than 1,600 sites, ranging from gardens of private houses, to cemeteries and public parks.

There are 156 registered parks and gardens in West Midlands. 12 are listed at grade I, the highest grade, 48 at grade II*, the middle grade, and 96 at grade II, the lowest grade.


Key

Parks and gardens

Herefordshire

Shropshire

Staffordshire

Warwickshire

West Midlands

Worcestershire

References

Notes

Listed parks and gardens in England
West Midlands (region)